Metalycaeus is a genus of tropical land snails  with an operculum, terrestrial gastropod mollusks in the family Alycaeidae.

Species

 Metalycaeus aborensis (Godwin-Austen, 1914)
 Metalycaeus anas Páll-Gergely & A. Reischütz, 2021
 Metalycaeus aries Páll-Gergely & Auffenberg, 2021
 Metalycaeus awalycaeoides Páll-Gergely & Hunyadi, 2017
 Metalycaeus beddomei (Godwin-Austen, 1914)
 Metalycaeus bhutanensis (Godwin-Austen, 1914)
 Metalycaeus bicarinatus Páll-Gergely & Hunyadi, 2021
 Metalycaeus brahma (Godwin-Austen, 1886)
 Metalycaeus burtii (Godwin-Austen, 1874)
 Metalycaeus caroli (O. Semper, 1862)
 Metalycaeus crenulatus (Benson, 1859)
 Metalycaeus cyphogyrus (Quadras & Möllendorff, 1895)
 Metalycaeus dikrangensis (Godwin-Austen, 1914)
 Metalycaeus distinctus (Godwin-Austen, 1893)
 Metalycaeus godwinausteni Páll-Gergely, 2020
 Metalycaeus heudei (Bavay & Dautzenberg, 1900)
 Metalycaeus hirasei (Pilsbry, 1900)
 Metalycaeus hungerfordianus (G. Nevill, 1881)
 Metalycaeus ibex Páll-Gergely & Hunyadi, 2017
 Metalycaeus inflatus (Godwin-Austen, 1874)
 Metalycaeus kamakiaensis (Godwin-Austen, 1914)
 Metalycaeus laevis (Pilsbry & Y. Hirase, 1909)
 Metalycaeus laosensis Páll-Gergely, 2017
 Metalycaeus latecostatus (Möllendorff, 1882)
 Metalycaeus libonensis (D.-N. Chen, D.-H. Li & T.-C. Luo, 2003)
 Metalycaeus lohitensis (Godwin-Austen, 1914)
 Metalycaeus luyorensis (Godwin-Austen, 1914)
 Metalycaeus macgregori (Godwin-Austen, 1914)
 Metalycaeus magnificus (Godwin-Austen, 1914)
 Metalycaeus minatoi Páll-Gergely, 2017
 Metalycaeus muciferus (Heude, 1885)
 Metalycaeus mundulus (Godwin-Austen, 1914)
 Metalycaeus nipponensis (Reinhardt, 1877)
 Metalycaeus oakesi (Godwin-Austen, 1914)
 Metalycaeus oharai Páll-Gergely & Hunyadi, 2017
 Metalycaeus okuboi Páll-Gergely & Hunyadi, 2017
 Metalycaeus panggianus (Godwin-Austen, 1914)
 Metalycaeus physis (Benson, 1859)
 Metalycaeus polygonoma (W. T. Blanford, 1862)
 Metalycaeus prosectus (Benson, 1857)
 Metalycaeus pygmachos Páll-Gergely & Hunyadi, 2021
 Metalycaeus quadrasi (Möllendorff, 1895)
 Metalycaeus rathouisianus (Heude, 1882)
 Metalycaeus rotundatus (Godwin-Austen, 1914)
 Metalycaeus rubinus (Godwin-Austen, 1893)
 Metalycaeus rugosus (Godwin-Austen, 1914)
 Metalycaeus satsumanus (Pilsbry, 1902)
 Metalycaeus semperi Páll-Gergely & Auffenberg, 2019
 Metalycaeus sibbumensis (Godwin-Austen, 1914)
 Metalycaeus sinensis (Heude, 1882)
 Metalycaeus stylifer (Benson, 1857)
 Metalycaeus subinflatus (Godwin-Austen, 1914)
 Metalycaeus suhajdai Páll-Gergely, 2020
 Metalycaeus teriaensis (Godwin-Austen, 1914)
 Metalycaeus tomotrema (Möllendorff, 1887)
 Metalycaeus toruputuensis (Godwin-Austen, 1914)
 Metalycaeus varius (Pilsbry & Y. Hirase, 1905)
 Metalycaeus vesica (Godwin-Austen, 1914)
 Metalycaeus vinctus (Pilsbry, 1902)
 Metalycaeus yamneyensis (Godwin-Austen, 1914)
 Metalycaeus zayuensis (W.-H. Zhang, W.-H. Chen & W.-H. Zhou, 2008)
; Species brought into synonymy:
 Metalycaeus elevatus (Heude, 1886): synonym of Dicharax elevatus (Heude, 1886) (unaccepted combination)
 Metalycaeus kengtungensis (Godwin-Austen, 1914): synonym of Metalycaeus heudei (Bavay & Dautzenberg, 1900) (junior synonym)

References

External links

 Pilsbry, H. A. (1900). Notices of new Japanese land snails. Proceedings of the Academy of Natural Sciences of Philadelphia. 52: 381-384.
 Godwin-Austen, H. H. (1882-1920). Land and freshwater Mollusca of India, including South Arabia, Baluchistan, Afghanistan, Kashmir, Nepal, Burmah, Pegu, Tenasserim, Malay Peninsula, Ceylon, and other islands of the Indian Ocean. Supplementary to Messrs. Theobald and Hanley's Conchologia Indica. London, Taylor & Francis.
 Páll-Gergely, B., Sajan, S., Tripathy, B., Meng, K., Asami, T. & Ablett, J.D. (2020). Genus-level revision of the Alycaeidae (Gastropoda: Cyclophoroidea), with an annotated species catalog. ZooKeys. 981: 1–220.

Alycaeidae